Stefano Crisci (born August 18, 1989 in Atessa) is an Italian professional football player currently playing for Lega Pro Seconda Divisione team A.C. Bellaria Igea Marina on loan from Parma F.C.

External links
 

1989 births
Living people
People from Atessa
Italian footballers
A.C. Bellaria Igea Marina players
Parma Calcio 1913 players
Vastese Calcio 1902 players
Association football forwards
Sportspeople from the Province of Chieti
Footballers from Abruzzo